The HGV-202F is an Indian hypersonic glide vehicle (HGV) being designed, developed, and manufactured by an Indian Defence and Space company HTNP Industries.

Production
HGV-202F a hypersonic Boost-glide vehicle is being designed, developed, and manufactured by an Indian Defense and Space company HTNP Industries. It is designed to be mounted on a Agni-V and Agni-VI, a type of ballistic missile specifically designed to carry HGVs. According to the Arms Control Association, "Hypersonic glide vehicles are distinguished from traditional ballistic missiles by their ability to maneuver and operate at lower altitudes."

Context
The maneuverability and high speed of the HGV raises new challenges for conventional missile defense systems. With the disadvantage again swinging toward defensive systems, many in the defense industry are worried hypersonic weapons will rekindle an arms race such as the one during the cold war era.

See also

 Avangard (hypersonic glide vehicle)
 DF-ZF
 Hypersonic Technology Demonstrator Vehicle

References 

Hypersonic aircraft
Proposed aircraft of India